"Rid of You" is the tenth single by Natalia. The song was meant to be the first single of her third album, but a few weeks after she recorded this song her voice "crashed". As a result, the recordings of the new album couldn't take place and Rid of You couldn't get any promotion. The song still reached number 14 without any promotion or a music video.

Charts

2006 singles
Natalia (Belgian singer) songs